The 2016 season was Bodø/Glimt's third, and final, season back in the Tippeligaen since their relegation at the end of the 2009 season. Bodø/Glimt finished the season in 15th position, dropping back down into OBOS-ligaen, whilst in the Norwegian Cup, they reached the Semi-finals before defeat to Rosenborg.

Squad

Transfers

In

Loans in

Out

Loans out

Released

Friendlies

Competitions

Tippeligaen

Results summary

Results by round

Results

Table

Norwegian Cup

Squad statistics

Appearances and goals

|-
|colspan="14"|Players away from Bodø/Glimt on loan:
|-
|colspan="14"|Players who appeared for Bodø/Glimt no longer at the club:

|}

Goal scorers

Clean sheets

Disciplinary record

References

FK Bodo Glimt
FK Bodø/Glimt seasons